Goniaea vocans is a species of grasshopper in the family Acrididae.

Synonyms
The following are synonyms of this species:
Goniaea acuta Sjöstedt, 1921
Goniaea auripennis Sjöstedt, 1921
Goniaea flava Tepper, 1896
Goniaea fuscobasalis Sjöstedt, 1921
Goniaea grootensis Sjöstedt, 1930
Goniaea hyalina Sjöstedt, 1921
Goniaea maculicornis Stål, 1878
Goniaea micronotum Sjöstedt, 1936
Goniaea mjoebergi Sjöstedt, 1920
Goniaea planiformis Sjöstedt, 1934

References

vocans
Insects described in 1775
Taxa named by Johan Christian Fabricius